Church Green Buildings Historic District is a historic district at 101-113 Summer Street in Boston, Massachusetts.

It was built on the site of New South Church, which had been designed by Charles Bulfinch, following the destruction of the church in the Great Boston Fire of 1872. The building was originally used by trade association offices and warehouses for the leather trade. The design is thought to be by Jonathan Preston

The district  was added to the National Register of Historic Places in 1999.

This building was designated as a Boston Landmark by the Boston Landmarks Commission in 1979.

See also
National Register of Historic Places listings in northern Boston, Massachusetts

References

Commercial buildings completed in 1873
Historic districts in Suffolk County, Massachusetts
National Register of Historic Places in Boston
Historic districts on the National Register of Historic Places in Massachusetts
Landmarks in Financial District, Boston